Lombo-Bouenguidi is a department of Ogooué-Lolo Province in eastern Gabon. The capital lies at Pana. It had a population of 4,635 in 2013.

Towns and villages

References

Ogooué-Lolo Province
Departments of Gabon